Massimino is the smallest municipality in the Province of Savona in the Italian region Liguria, located about  west of Genoa and about  west of Savona.

The municipality of Massimino contains the frazioni (subdivisions, mainly villages and hamlets) San Vincenzo, San Pietro, Selagni, Cerri, Costa, and Villa Muraglia.

Massimino borders the following municipalities: Bagnasco, Calizzano, Murialdo, and Perlo.

History
The origin of Massimino, as the name reveals, is linked to the medieval foundation of the Benedictine grangy of San Massimo, built on a hill above the village. Being a border town, it had to accommodate gangs of smugglers and brigands who from Piedmont sought refuge in the marquisate. Possession of the marquises of Ceva who ceded it after 1260 to the Del Carretto of Finale, then subdued the Spanish rule and in 1713 was purchased by Genoa for its strategic position in control of the Via dei Giovetti.

References

Cities and towns in Liguria